
Clare Hammond (born 1985) is a British concert pianist. In 2016, she was awarded the Royal Philharmonic Society's Young Artist award.

Early life and education
Hammond grew up in Nottingham, was educated at Nottingham Girls' High School and studied at Emmanuel College, Cambridge, where she achieved a double first in music. She then undertook postgraduate study with Ronan O'Hora at the Guildhall School of Music and Drama. She has also completed a DMA at London's City University, writing her thesis on 20th-century left-hand piano concertos commissioned by pianist Paul Wittgenstein.

Performance career
Hammond has performed in concert halls and at festivals across Europe, and is regularly broadcast on BBC Radio 3 and other European radio networks. She has collaborated with artists including the Carducci, Brodsky, Endellion, and Badke quartets, and Henning Kraggerud, Andrew Kennedy, Jennifer Pike, and Lawrence Power. Clare has appeared as a concerto soloist with the Philharmonia, BBC Symphony Orchestra, BBC National Orchestra of Wales, Warsaw Philharmonic, City of Birmingham Symphony Orchestra, Royal Philharmonic Orchestra, Royal Liverpool Philharmonic Orchestra, Ulster Orchestra and Swedish Chamber Orchestra.

In 2016, she was awarded the Royal Philharmonic Society's Young Artist award.

An advocate of contemporary music, she has given world premieres of major works by composers such as Edmund Finnis, Benjamin Attahir, Robert Saxton, Kenneth Hesketh, Edwin Roxburgh, John McCabe and Arlene Sierra. In 2018 she developed Ghosts and Whispers, for piano and film, in collaboration with animators the Quay Brothers and composer John Woolrich, which has been performed at the Barbican in London and Fundación Juan March in Madrid.

Hammond has a strong interest in Polish music and culture and co-curated a centenary festival for Andrzej Panufnik at King's Place in London. She has toured Poland on multiple occasions, and performed at the Chopin and his Europe Festival in Warsaw in 2014.

Film work
In 2015 Hammond appeared as the young Miss Shepherd in the film adaptation of The Lady in the Van by Alan Bennett and recorded the film's soundtrack with George Fenton, the Philharmonia, and the BBC Concert Orchestra.

She was involved as a piano teacher in the 2011 film Hysteria and was Felicity Jones's hand double.

Discography
Hammond has released a number of recordings:
 Hélène de Montgeroult: Etudes (BIS Records, 2022)
 Adam Gorb: Piano Music (Toccata Classics, 2022)
 Variations – a programme of twentieth and twenty-first century variations for piano (BIS Records, 2021)
 Josef Mysliveček: Complete Music for Keyboard – with the Swedish Chamber Orchestra and Nicholas McGegan (BIS Records, 2019)
 Roman Palester: Concertinos – with Sinfonia Iuventus and Łukasz Borowicz (PWM, 2019)
 Robert Saxton: Piano Music (Toccata Classics, 2018)
 Art of Dancing – music for piano and trumpet, with Simon Desbruslais (Signum Records, 2017)
 Horae (pro clara) – solo piano music by Ken Hesketh (BIS Records, 2016)
 The Lady In The Van soundtrack (Sony, 2015)
 Etude – 20th and 21st-century etudes by Unsuk Chin, Karol Szymanowski, Sergei Lyapunov and Nikolai Kapustin (BIS Records, 2015)
 Reflections – piano works by Andrzej and Roxanna Panufnik (BIS Records, 2014)
 Piano Polyptych – piano works by contemporary British composers (Prima Facie Records, 2012)

References

External links
 
IMDb (Internet Movie Database)

1980s births
Living people
British classical pianists
British women pianists
Alumni of the Guildhall School of Music and Drama
Alumni of Emmanuel College, Cambridge
People educated at Nottingham Girls' High School
21st-century pianists
21st-century women pianists